Krishan Avtaar is a 1993 Indian Hindi-language action film directed by Ashok Gaikwad and produced by Raajiv Kumar, starring Mithun Chakraborty, Somy Ali, Hashmat Khan, Paresh Rawal and Sujata Mehta.

Plot 
Police Inspector Krishan Kumar lives a middle class life with his lovely wife, Suman. Suman gets pregnant and gives birth to a baby girl but tragically passes away, leaving Krishan widowed, heart-broken and devastated. Krishan also encounters a tumor, which is presently inoperable, and may eventually lead to his death. Then a large number of the city's children go missing, and Krishan, together with Inspector Avtaar are assigned to investigate this matter. They are also asked to investigate the murder of fellow police inspector Vishnu Sawant. Krishan's investigation leads him to corruption in his very own department; the involvement of a prominent minister in the government; and the daughter of Inspector Sawant himself. Faced with failing health and vision, Krishan must make his move quickly before he becomes totally disabled from doing any more police work.

Cast 
Mithun Chakraborty as Police Inspector Krishan Kumar
Somy Ali as Sonia Sawant
Sujata Mehta as Suman
Paresh Rawal as JD
Shakti Kapoor as Maqsood Patel
Laxmikant Berde as Lallan
Tinnu Anand as Banarasi Das
Raza Murad as Commissioner Deshpande
Shiva Rindani
Goga Kapoor as Inspector Sawant
Avtar Gill as Inspector Raghuveer
Deep Dhillon as Pasha
Anjana Mumtaz as Mrs Sawant
Bharat Kapoor as Jamnadas,Landlord
Mac Mohan
Gavin Packard as Peter
Guddi Maruti as Mary
Hashmat Khan
Baby Udita Gaur
Ankush Mohit
Jay Kalgutkar

Soundtrack

References 

1993 films
1990s Hindi-language films
Films scored by Nadeem–Shravan
Mithun's Dream Factory films
Films shot in Ooty
Films directed by Ashok Gaikwad
Indian action films

External links